Malina may refer to:

Places
Malina Cove, Antarctica
Malina (depopulated settlement), between Bileća and Trebinje in Bosnia and Herzegovina
Malina (river), a tributary of the Morava river in Slovakia
 Mălina, a tributary of the river Iapa in Neamț County, Romania
 Mălina, a tributary of the river Siret in Galați County, Romania

Bulgaria
Malina, Dobrich Province
Malina, Burgas Province

Poland
Malina, Kuyavian-Pomeranian Voivodeship (north-central Poland)
Malina, Łódź Voivodeship (central Poland)

People
 Malina (surname)
 Malina (given name)
 Malina (Bulgarian singer)
 Mălina (name), a Romanian female name

Fiction
Malina (novel), a 1971 novel by Ingeborg Bachmann
Malina (film), a 1991 German-Austrian film based on the novel
Malina, a character from the 2015 TV miniseries Heroes Reborn
Malina (The Emperor's New School), a character in the 2006 TV series The Emperor's New School
Malina, a character from the video game Helltaker

Taxonomy
 Diboma malina, a beetle in the family Cerambycidae
 Ilnacora malina, a plant bug in the family Miridae
 Langsdorfia malina, a moth in the family Cossidae
 Rekoa malina, a butterfly in the family Lycaenidae

Other uses
Malinas score, an evaluation of whether a pregnant woman is about to give birth
Malina (mythology), an Inuit solar deity
Malina (album), a 2017 album by progressive rock/metal band Leprous

See also